Zinc finger protein 79 is a protein that in humans is encoded by the ZNF79 gene.

References

Further reading